Monalisa Chinda  (born 13 September 1974) is a Nigerian actress, film producer, television personality and media personality.

Early life
Monalisa Chinda was born in Port Harcourt, Rivers State to Ikwerre parents. She is the firstborn in her family of two sons and four daughters. She attended Army Children's School GRA for Primary and then Archdeacon Crowther Memorial Girls' School, Elelenwo. Both schools are located in Port Harcourt, Nigeria. She obtained a degree in theatre arts from the University of Port Harcourt.

Career and activities 
Monalisa's first major movie was Pregnant Virgin, which she did in 1996 and subsequently, after she graduated in 2000, she did Above the Law and has done many others since then.

In 2007 her road to stardom kicked off when she started appearing in the television soap Heaven’s Gate. In 2011, she debuted as Executive Producer in the Royal Arts Academy movie, 'Kiss & Tell', which Emem Isong co-produced with her and Desmond Elliot directed. In 2012, she became one of the first of four Nollywood actors to be featured on the cover of Hollywood Weekly Magazine.
This November,2014 the actress is branching out of acting a little bit and is set to debut her Talk Show titled 'You & I with Monalisa."

Monalisa is involved in a lot of charity work. She has a column (Monalisa Code) in the Saturday edition of The Sun Newspapers where she writes on social issues and relationships. She is a consultant with Royal Arts Academy, a media school known for breeding new talents, in acting, directing, and screenwriting.'  She partner with Goge African to encourage tourists in Nigeria.

Awards and recognition 
 In 2011, Monalisa was crowned the Face of Port Harcourt - Carnival Queen, in her hometown of Rivers State.
 2010 she was nominated for Best Actress in a drama series at the Terracotta TV and Film Awards
 Best Actress, Afro Hollywood Award 2009 at the Monte Carlo Television Festival

Filmography
She has featured in more than 80 films.

Pregnant Virgin (1996)
Royal Grandmother (2007)
Sting 2 (2006)
Critical Truth (2008)
Kiss and Tell (2011)
Keeping my Man (2013)
Anointed Liars
Breaking Heart
Without Goodbye 
Above the Law (2000)
City of Angels
Weekend Getaway
Torn
Passionate Heart
Memories of the Heart
Itoro
Lagos Cougars
Spirit Love
Crazy People
Passionate Heart
Okon Lagos
Games Men Play
Nollywood Huslers
Gossip Nation
The Unthinkable (2014)
The Therapist (2015)
 Evil Project
The Good Husband (2020)

See also

 List of people from Port Harcourt
 List of Nigerians

References

 https://metronews247.co.uk/monalisa-chinda-in-an-exclusive-interview-opens-up-on-her-failed-marriage/ Metronews247 Media

External links

Monalisa Chinda on iMDb
Official Website

Living people
Actresses from Port Harcourt
1974 births
University of Port Harcourt alumni
Nigerian film actresses
20th-century Nigerian actresses
21st-century Nigerian actresses
Ikwerre people
Television personalities from Rivers State
Archdeacon Crowther Memorial Girls' School alumni
Igbo actresses
Igbo television personalities
Film producers from Rivers State
Nigerian television personalities
People from Rivers State